In computing, copy is a command in various operating systems. The command copies computer files from one directory to another.

Overview
Generally, the command copies files from one location to another. It is used to make copies of existing files, but can also be used to combine (concatenate) multiple files into target files. The destination defaults to the current working directory. If multiple source files are indicated, the destination must be a directory, or an error will result. The command can copy in text mode or binary mode; in text mode, copy will stop when it reaches the EOF character; in binary mode, the files will be concatenated in their entirety, ignoring EOF characters.

Files may be copied to devices. For example, copy file con outputs file to the screen console. Devices themselves may be copied to a destination file, for example, copy con file takes the text typed into the console and puts it into FILE, stopping when EOF (Ctrl+Z) is typed.

Implementations
The command is available in DEC RT-11, OS/8, RSX-11, Intel ISIS-II, iRMX 86, DEC TOPS-10, TOPS-20, OpenVMS, MetaComCo TRIPOS, Heath Company HDOS, Zilog Z80-RIO, Microware OS-9, DOS, DR FlexOS, IBM/Toshiba 4690 OS, TSL PC-MOS, HP MPE/iX, IBM OS/2, Microsoft Windows, Datalight ROM-DOS, ReactOS, SymbOS and DexOS.

The copy command is supported by Tim Paterson's SCP 86-DOS. Under IBM PC DOS/MS-DOS it is available since version 1. A more advanced copy command is called xcopy.

The equivalent Unix command is cp, the CP/M command is PIP.
The command is analogous to the Stratus OpenVOS copy_file command.

Example for DOS
 copy letter.txt [destination]

Files may be copied to device files (e.g. copy letter.txt lpt1 sends the file to the printer on lpt1. copy letter.txt con would output to stdout, like the type command. Note that copy page1.txt+page2.txt book.txt will concatenate the files and output them as book.txt. Which is just like the cat command). It can also copy files between different disk drives.

There are two command-line switches to modify the behaviour when concatenating files:

 Text mode - This copies the text content of the file, stopping when it reaches the EOF character.

 copy /a doc1.txt + doc2.txt doc3.txt
 copy /a *.txt doc3.txt

 Binary mode - This concatenates files in their entirety, ignoring EOF characters.

 copy /b image1.jpg + image2.jpg image3.jpg

See also
 XCOPY in DOS, OS/2, Windows etc.
 cp (Unix)
 Peripheral Interchange Program

References

Further reading

External links

 copy | Microsoft Docs
 Open source COPY implementation that comes with MS-DOS v2.0

Internal DOS commands
MSX-DOS commands
OS/2 commands
ReactOS commands
Windows commands
Microcomputer software
Microsoft free software
Windows administration
File copy utilities